Soldier's Rest is a historic farmhouse located in Berryville, Clarke County, Virginia. It was constructed about 1780 for the family of William Morton, and it was later owned and added to by Daniel Morgan, a general in the American Revolution, and by Col Griffin Taylor, a veteran of the War of 1812, perhaps giving the home its name "Soldier's Rest".

Prior to the current house being built, a smaller one stood some 200 yards away, and said to be the place where George Washington stayed when he was surveying the land here for Lord Fairfax in 1748.
 

It was listed on the National Register of Historic Places in 1996.

Notes

References

Georgian architecture in Virginia
Houses in Clarke County, Virginia
Houses on the National Register of Historic Places in Virginia
National Register of Historic Places in Clarke County, Virginia
Plantation houses in Virginia